James Ferguson (born June 16, 1959) is an American anthropologist. He is known for his work on the politics and anthropology of international development, specifically his critical stance (development criticism). He was chair of the Anthropology Department at Stanford University. His best-known work is his book, The Anti-Politics Machine. He delivered the most prestigious lecture in anthropology, the Morgan Lecture, in 2009, for his work on basic income. He earned his B.A. in cultural anthropology from the University of California, Santa Barbara and an M.A. and Ph.D. in social anthropology from Harvard University.

Selected publications
2015, Give a Man a Fish. Duke University Press
2010, The Uses of Neoliberalism. Antipode, volume 41, supplement 1, 2010.
2006, Global Shadows: Africa in the Neoliberal World Order, Duke University Press.
1999, Expectations of Modernity: Myths and Meanings of Urban Life on the Zambian Copperbelt, University of California Press.
1997, Editor, Anthropological Locations: Boundaries and Grounds of a Field Science (with Akhil Gupta), Univ. of California Press.
1997, Editor, Culture, Power, Place: Explorations in Critical Anthropology (with Akhil Gupta), Duke University Press.
1990, The Anti-Politics Machine: 'Development,' Depoliticization, and Bureaucratic Power in Lesotho, Cambridge University Press. Republished in 1994 by University of Minnesota Press.

References

External links
Ferguson's faculty profile at Stanford
Interview with James Ferguson by 'Theory Talks'

Living people
Stanford University Department of Anthropology faculty
University of California, Santa Barbara alumni
Harvard Graduate School of Arts and Sciences alumni
1959 births